David Bryan Woodside (born July 25, 1969) is an American actor. He is best known for his television roles as the bass singer Melvin Franklin in The Temptations, Robin Wood in Buffy the Vampire Slayer, Malcolm Franks in Single Ladies, Dr. Joseph Prestridge in Parenthood, the angel Amenadiel in Lucifer, as well as Wayne Palmer in the thriller series 24.

Early life
David Bryan Woodside was born in the Jamaica neighborhood of New York City's Queens borough on July 25, 1969. He has a BA from the State University of New York at Albany and an MFA from the Yale School of Drama.

Career
Woodside got his start in the second season of Murder One in 1996, playing Aaron Mosley. After that series' cancellation, he guest starred on The Practice, Snoops, The Division, and Once and Again. He made a guest appearance on JAG in its final season as FBI agent Rod Benton. From 2002-2003, he starred in 14 episodes of the final season of Buffy the Vampire Slayer as Robin Wood, the Principal of Sunnydale High School. He followed this up by playing the pragmatic Wayne Palmer, the Chief of Staff, on the Fox series 24. Introduced in the third season, he returned to reprise the role as a guest star in the series' fifth season in episodes 1–2 and 14–18, and returned as a series regular for the sixth season as the President of the United States.

Woodside had a guest role as Marlon Waylord in the 2004 CSI episode "Harvest". In 2007, he was a guest star on the TV show Grey's Anatomy in the show's 4th-season episode "Forever Young" wherein he played the character of Marcus. Woodside also guest-starred as a doctor in the series finale of the USA Network series Monk. He had a recurring role on the CW series Hellcats. In 2009, he starred in the first series of the US drama Lie to Me. He starred as Malcolm Franks on the VH1 series Single Ladies, playing opposite LisaRaye McCoy as Keisha Greene. In June 2014, he began appearing in Suits as Jeff Malone. In 2016, he began playing the angel Amenadiel in the Fox/Netflix series Lucifer.

Personal life
Woodside was in a relationship with actress Golden Brooks from 2008 to 2010. They have a daughter, who was born in 2009.

Filmography

Film

Television

References

External links
 

1969 births
Living people
Male actors from New York City
American male film actors
American male television actors
People from Queens, New York
University at Albany, SUNY alumni
Yale School of Drama alumni
African-American male actors
21st-century African-American people
20th-century African-American people